The Ulster U-21 Hurling Championship, or for sponsorship reasons the Erin Ulster Under-21 Hurling Championship, is an Under 21 hurling tournament between counties affiliated to Ulster. The winners of the Ulster championship go on to qualify for the All-Ireland Under-21 Hurling Championship. The most successful county to date are Antrim who have won the competition on 36 occasions.

The 2010 champions were Antrim who defeated Armagh by 0-21 to 0-16.
. Antrim had won the 2009 title by beating Derry.
In 2011, Antrim completed a three in a row of titles, beating Armagh.

Armagh, Cavan, Donegal, Fermanagh, Monaghan and Tyrone have never won an Under-21 hurling championship.

Winners Listed By County

Only three counties from Ulster have won the Under-21 championship

Finals Listed By Year

Notes:
 Antrim only team entered
1968 was a "B" Grade competition. Antrim represented Ulster in the All-Ireland Under-21 Hurling Championship.
The 2008 competition was organised on a league basis, with each team playing one another once. Therefore, there was no final, Derry clinched the Championship in their final league game against Down.

See also
 Ulster Senior Hurling Championship

References

2011 Final report

Sources
 Roll of Honour on gaainfo.com
 Complete Roll of Honour on Kilkenny GAA bible

4
Ulster